The Fabulous Dr Fable is a 1973 American TV movie.

References

External links

1973 films
1973 television films
Films directed by Bernard Girard